Ravni Dol is a small settlement in the hills northwest of Krka in the Municipality of Ivančna Gorica in central Slovenia. The area is part of the historical region of Lower Carniola. The municipality is now included in the Central Slovenia Statistical Region. 

A small roadside chapel-shrine in the western part of the settlement was built in 1932. It contains a statue of the Virgin Mary.

References

External links
Ravni Dol on Geopedia

Populated places in the Municipality of Ivančna Gorica